Faith Healer is a Canadian indie rock band from Edmonton, Alberta, whose core member is singer and songwriter Jessica Jalbert. Another long-time member is singer-songwriter, producer and recording engineer Renny Wilson.

History
Jalbert first collaborated with Wilson on her solo debut album Brother Loyola in 2011, before deciding to adopt the band name Faith Healer as she did not want her music to be pigeonholed as singer-songwriter pop.

The band's debut album Cosmic Troubles was released March 31, 2015 on Mint Records. The album was met with positive reviews from Pitchfork and Exclaim!. Wilson played several instruments on the album and created a number of the arrangements.

Jalbert and Wilson recorded their second album, Try ;-), in Montreal.  It was released in September 2017. The pair added Jenni Roberts and Mitch Holtby to create a complete band; the group performed at the 2017 Pop Montreal Festival. The album was longlisted for the 2018 Polaris Music Prize. Additional band members include Ross Faulder and Connor Donaldson.

Discography

As Jessica Jalbert

Singles 
 Paris Green (2011)
 Necromancy (2011)
 Lack Of A Lake (2011)

Album 
 Brother Loyola (Old Ugly Recording Co, 2011)

Music Video 
 Paris Green - Directed by Mike Robertson (2011)

As Faith Healer

Singles 
 Until The World Lets Me Go (2014)
 Again (2015) 
 Universe (2015)
 Canonized (2015)
 Light Of Loving (2017)
 Sterling Silver (2017)
 Try ;-) (2017)

Albums 
 Cosmic Troubles (Mint Records, 2015)
 Try ;-) (Mint Records, 2017)

Music Videos 
 Canonized - Directed by Mike Robertson (2015)
 Try ;-) - Directed by Jordan Minkoff (2017)

 & Waiting - (Homemade, 2018) 

 Another Fool - Directed by Renny Wilson (2022)

References 

Canadian indie rock groups
Musical groups from Edmonton
Mint Records artists
Musical groups established in 2015
2015 establishments in Alberta